Subscription boxes are a recurring delivery of niche products as part of a marketing strategy and a method of product distribution. Subscription boxes are used by subscription-based ecommerce businesses, referred to as "subcom" for short, which follow a subscription business model. They target a wide range of customers and cater to a variety of specific needs and interests. It is estimated that there are 400 to 600 different kinds of subscription boxes in the United States alone and more overseas. Subscriptions vary in both cost and frequency, making them more accessible to a greater range of customers with different socioeconomic backgrounds. Subscription boxes tend to range from $10 to $100.

History and appeal

Various subscription commerce companies are growing rapidly. BarkBox’s subscribers grew from 1,500 to 55,000 between 2012 and 2013. According to Forbes, Birchbox, which is arguably the most recognizable service and valued at a reported $485 million in April, 2014, led the subscription box trend with its 2010 launch. Birchbox's model of providing customers with samples of personal care products in order to upsell customers into buying the standard sizes of the sample products they enjoyed has proven to be a successful marketing tool. Birchbox has reached nearly 400,000 monthly subscribers and has inspired many other companies to start utilizing subscription boxes.

Part of the appeal of subscription boxes is that consumers discover products they might not have otherwise. This allows customers to try products and brands risk-free. The increased exposure to new products helps customers discover optimal products for their preferences and needs. While only some subscription boxes have return options, there are places online to exchange unwanted items. The subscription box industry came into the limelight when Unilever acquired Dollar Shave Club, another well-known entity in this space.

Business costs
Shipping costs and the need to constantly innovate present challenges to retailers offering the subscription service.

See also
Meal kit
Meals on wheels
Vegetable box scheme

References

Distribution (marketing)
Subscription services
Revenue models